Acanthoaxis is a monotypic genus of corals belonging to the monotypic family Acanthoaxiidae. The only species is Acanthoaxis wirtzi.

The species is found in coasts of Cameroon.

References

Acanthoaxiidae
Octocorallia genera
Monotypic cnidarian genera